Frate Atanasiu di Iaci or Athanasiu da Jaci was a Benedictine monk and historiographer from Aci. He wrote Vinuta di lu re Japicu in Catania (c.1295), a Sicilian chronicle (or romance) of the arrival and stay of James I in Catania in May 1287. He may also be the author of another Sicilian history, Lu rebellamentu di Sichilia, written circa 1290, by an anonymous person of Messina. Vincenzo di Giovanni suggested that Atanasiu was of Saracen ancestry.

Vincenzo de Gaetano first expressed doubt about the authenticity of the Vinuta and the historicity of Atanasiu. The Vinuta appears in no earlier work than Pietro Carrera, Delle memorie historiche della città di Cantania (1639). He claimed to have found it in a manuscript of San Nicolò l'Arena, now lost. It was first published by the Pietro Bentivegna of Palermo in their Opuscoli di autori Siciliani (1760). Its authorship was also treated by Antonio Mongitore Biblioteca Sicula (1708). The Vinuta was accepted as authentic by Enrico Sicardi for his 1917 edition. Kenneth Setton follows him, but notes that though it sometimes adds valuable details to the history of the War of the Sicilian Vespers, it is frequently untrustworthy. Giulio Bertoni considered it authentic, pointing to the antiquity of its language. More recently, Louis Mendola contends that there is no basis for believing in the historicity of its putative author.  If authentic, the Vinuta is an important source for the influence of the Italian languages on Sicilian.

Below is a passage describing James' arrival in Catania, then occupied by the Angevins, mostly Frenchmen, followers of Charles of Anjou:

The French (franzisi) had landed on the same day between Catania and Syracuse and had begun to besiege Augusta. By June their supplies were running short. In July they were forced to lift their siege of Augusta and their garrison fled Catania.

Editions
Biondelli, Bernardino (1856). Studi linguìstici. G. Bernardoni.

Notes

13th-century Italian writers
People from Aci Castello
13th-century Italian historians
Writers from Sicily
Italian Christian monks
War of the Sicilian Vespers